Ushtobe (Üştöbe) is a town and seat of Karatal District in the Almaty Region of south-eastern Kazakhstan. Population:   
 
The Central Hospital of District is located in Ushtobe.

References

Populated places in Almaty Region